Chantimelle FC is a Grenadian football club from Chantimelle, Saint Patrick Parish that plays in the Grenada Premier Division.

References

External links
 Official Website
 Chantimelle Facebook Page

Chantimelle